Eiconaxius albatrossae is a species of mud lobster from the Pacific Ocean.

References

Thalassinidea
Crustaceans described in 1996